Petru Daniel Vădrariu (born 25 July 1990) is a Romanian footballer who plays as a winger for Austrian club SV Schalchen.

Career
Vădrariu signed for Moldovan National Division club Sfântul Gheorghe Suruceni in January 2021.

Honours
CSM Reșița
Liga III: 2018–19

References

External links
 
 
 Daniel Vădrariu at ÖFB

1990 births
Living people
Sportspeople from Reșița
Romanian footballers
Association football midfielders
Liga I players
Liga II players
Moldovan Super Liga players
SV Schwechat players
ASC Daco-Getica București players
CSM Jiul Petroșani players
FC Dinamo București players
FC Astra Giurgiu players
CSM Ceahlăul Piatra Neamț players
FC Bihor Oradea players
FC Tiraspol players
CS Sportul Snagov players
FC Dunărea Călărași players
ACS Poli Timișoara players
FC Mauerwerk players
FC UTA Arad players
CSM Reșița players
FC Sfîntul Gheorghe players
Romanian expatriate footballers
Romanian expatriate sportspeople in Austria
Expatriate footballers in Austria
Romanian expatriate sportspeople in Moldova
Expatriate footballers in Moldova